A Giant Dog is an American punk rock band from Austin, Texas. It has been described by Bandcamp Daily as "one of Austin's most thrillingly irreverent bands". It consists of Sabrina Ellis, Andrew Cashen, Andy Bauer, Graham Low, and Daniel Blanchard.

History
A Giant Dog was formed by Sabrina Ellis, Andrew Cashen, and Orville Neeley in 2008. The band released the debut album, Fight, in 2012. In 2013, the band released Bone. In 2016, they signed with Merge Records. The band's third album, Pile, was released on Merge Records in 2016. The band's fourth album, Toy, was released on Merge Records in 2017. In 2019, they released a full-album cover of Arcade Fire's 2007 release Neon Bible.  Ellis and Cashen also form the rock band Sweet Spirit.

Members
Current
 Sabrina Ellis – vocals
 Andrew Cashen – vocals, guitar
 Andy Bauer – guitar
 Graham Low – bass guitar
 Daniel Blanchard – drums

Former
 Orville Neeley
 Matthew Strmiska

Discography
Albums
 Fight (2012)
 Bone (2013)
 Pile (2016)
 Toy (2017)
 Neon Bible (2019)

EPs
 House (2010)

Singles
 "The Grand" b/w "QYJARA" (2010)
 "Dammit Pomegranate" b/w "Can't Complain" (2012)

References

External links
 A Giant Dog at Merge Records
 
 

Merge Records artists
Musical groups from Austin, Texas
Punk rock groups from Texas
Musical groups established in 2008